The Beverly Wilshire, A Four Seasons Hotel, commonly known as the Beverly Wilshire Hotel, is a historic luxury hotel in Beverly Hills, California. Located at the intersection of Wilshire Boulevard and Rodeo Drive, it was completed in 1928. It has been used as a shooting location for films and television series.

Location
The hotel is located at 9500 Wilshire Boulevard on the east side of South Rodeo Drive in Beverly Hills, California.

History
The hotel was constructed by real estate developer Walter G. McCarty on the site of the former Beverly Hills Speedway. It was completed in 1928 (when the city had fewer than 18,000 residents), and was then known as the "Beverly Wilshire Apartment Hotel". The E-shaped structure is built of a Tuscan stone and Carrara marble in the Italian Renaissance architecture style.

Renamed the Beverly Wilshire Hotel by new owners, it was renovated with a ballroom in the 1940s by architect Paul Revere Williams to accommodate the popular big bands of the day. An Olympic-sized swimming pool was built and championship tennis courts were added, with tennis champion Pancho Gonzalez as tennis director.

The hotel changed hands in 1958 and again in 1961, when it was purchased by a group of investors headed by Hernando Courtright. The hotel was branded as Hernando Courtright's Beverly Wilshire Hotel. Courtright added a new tower wing in 1971, doubling the size of the hotel.

Hong Kong-based Regent International Hotels bought the 395-room luxury hotel in 1985 for $125 million, and renovated it at a further cost of $100 million, renaming it The Regent Beverly Wilshire. In 1992, Four Seasons Hotels and Resorts bought Regent International Hotels, and the hotel became The Regent Beverly Wilshire, a Four Seasons Hotel. 

The hotel was sold to Hong Kong-based private equity firm Joint Treasure International in 1995. In 2006, the hotel was again renamed following a renovation, dropping the Regent affiliation and becoming Beverly Wilshire, A Four Seasons Hotel.

Notable guests and as a filming location

On Saturday, October 9, 1937, F. Scott Fitzgerald lunched at the Beverly Wilshire with Ginevra King, whom he'd known when they were both young and who is held to have been a model for Daisy Buchanan, in his The Great Gatsby.

During a tour in 1940, the Beverly Wilshire was the only major Los Angeles hotel willing to accommodate Paul Robeson due to his race, at an exorbitant rate and providing he registered under an assumed name, and he therefore spent two hours every afternoon sitting in the lobby, where he was widely recognised, "to ensure that the next time Black come through, they'll have a place to stay." Los Angeles hotels lifted their restrictions on black guests soon afterwards.

Elvis Presley and later Warren Beatty spent a number of  years in the hotel. It was also the home of John Lennon, when he was separated for several months from his wife Yoko Ono.

The American socialite and Woolworth department store heiress Barbara Hutton spent her last years in near poverty and poor health in the hotel and died there in May 1979. 

In 1990, the Beverly Wilshire was the primary setting for the movie Pretty Woman, though most interior scenes were actually shot at the defunct Ambassador Hotel nearby. It also became a common filming location for HBO's Entourage television series, with cast and crew filming there at least three times per season when it was produced from 2004 until 2011.

See also

 Four Seasons Hotels and Resorts

References

External links
Official website

Hotels in Beverly Hills, California
Wilshire Boulevard
History of Los Angeles
Hotel buildings completed in 1928
Hotel buildings on the National Register of Historic Places in Los Angeles
Buildings and structures on the National Register of Historic Places in Los Angeles County, California
Hotels established in 1928
Four Seasons hotels and resorts
1928 establishments in California